The 1922–23 season saw Rochdale compete for their second season in the Football League Third Division North.

Statistics

     
  

 
 
 
 
 

  
  
   
  
 

 
 

 
  
 
 
|}

Final league table

Competitions

Legend

Football League Third Division North

Results by matchday

FA Cup

Lancashire Senior Cup

Manchester Cup

References

Rochdale A.F.C. seasons
Rochdale